The Soviet Union didn't compete at the World Artistic Gymnastics Championships until 1954.  Despite it being their first appearance they dominated the competition, winning gold in both team events and winning 20 total medals. The Soviet Union competed for the last time at the 1991 World Championships as the Soviet Union; the following year they competed as the Commonwealth of Independent States and in 1993 athletes from former Soviet member states officially began competing under their own flags.

Medalists

Medal tables

By gender

By event

References 

World Artistic Gymnastics Championships
Gymnastics in the Soviet Union